Live in Montreal may refer to:

Live in Montreal (Quo Vadis album)
Live in Montreal (October Sky album)
Live in Montreal, album by Bobby McFerrin
Live in Montreal 1977, album by  Emerson Lake and Palmer
Live in Montreal, album by Nikki Yanofsky
Live in Montreal, album by Gino Vannelli
Live in Montreal, album by Zachary Richard
Alright, Already: Live in Montréal Rufus Wainwright's second EP
Absent Lovers: Live in Montreal live album (2-CD set) by the band King Crimson
Satchurated: Live in Montreal